was a Japanese primatologist, who introduced the concept of kyōkan as a means of studying primates in his book Life of Japanese Monkeys (1969).

Notes

External links
Interview with Shigeru Miyamoto

1924 births
2021 deaths
20th-century Japanese zoologists
Primatologists
Japanese mammalogists
Japanese nature writers
Science writers
Kyoto University alumni
Academic staff of Kyoto University
Recipients of the Medal with Purple Ribbon
People from Hyōgo Prefecture